Telereal Trillium Ltd is a commercial property management, development and investment company, headquartered in central London, England. The company is privately owned by the Bernard Pears 1967 Trust and its management. Preference shares are held by the William Pears Group and management. Telereal Trillium was contracted by the Department for Work and Pensions to manage job centres and other buildings through March 2018.

It also entered a 20 year contract to manage property used by the DVLA beginning in April 2005. Telereal Trillium bought Network Rail's arches portfolio in joint venture with Blackstone Property Partners for £1.46bn in 2018.

History
Trillium was formed in 1997, to acquire the  property portfolio of the Department for Work and Pensions, which it did in 1998. Acquired by Land Securities in 2000, the company was renamed Land Securities Trillium.

In 2001, the 50/50 joint-venture company Telereal was established with William Pears Ltd, to acquire the property portfolio of British Telecom for £2.3Bn.

In 2002, Telereal began managing the property portfolios of O2 and Airwave. In 2004, Trillium signed property management agreements with Norwich Union and Barclays Bank. After Pears bought the remaining 50% interest in Telereal in 2005, the company completed the purchase of the property portfolio of the DVLA under a 20-year deal.

In 2008, Trillium signed deals to manage the property portfolios of the Royal Mail and Birmingham City Council. It then bought the project management division of AMEC, and then bought the office and branch properties of the Royal Bank of Scotland in partnership with the Prudential plc Investment Management. In 2009, after selling Aviva's Norwich headquarters for £134 million, Land Securities sold Trillium (excluding the Accor Hotels portfolio), to Telereal for £750 million, to form Telereal Trillium. The group then sold its 10% stake in the £1.3 billion Trillium Investment Partners fund, which invested in public-private partnerships covering at that point 108 assets including University College Hospital, London, to existing investors in the fund, which then renamed itself Semperian.

In January 2010, the company placed the majority of the Royal Bank of Scotland assets it owned up for sale, for a sum of £475 million. In November 2010, the UK Government revealed that Telereal Trillium was one of the top private companies in receipt of government spending, with a total annual expenditure of £284 million on property services.

Corporate affairs
Telereal Trillium owns more than 12,000 properties in the U.K. and is valued at more than £8 billion. As of 2018, Telereal Trillium holdings portfolio has a total floor area of 79 million square feet. The company's holdings have ranged from London landmark buildings to residential developments.

References

External links
Official site

Companies established in 1997
Property companies based in London
Pears family